The 2018 Kawasaki Frontale season is their 14th consecutive season in J1 League, they are defending champions after finishing top of the 2017 J1 League. They will also compete in the J.League Cup, Emperor's Cup, and AFC Champions League.

Squad
As of 22 January 2018.

Out on loan

Competitions

Super Cup

J1 League

League table

Results

J. League Cup

Results

Emperor's Cup

Results

AFC Champions League

Results

References

External links
 J.League official site

Kawasaki Frontale
Kawasaki Frontale seasons